Wowee Zowee: Sordid Sentinels Edition is a compilation album by Pavement released on November 7, 2006. It contains the band's 1995 album, Wowee Zowee, in its entirety, as well as outtakes and other rarities from that era, some of which had previously been unreleased.

Promotion and release
Sordid Sentinels Edition was released on November 7, 2006. Matador Records offered extra items to people who pre-ordered the reissue. Those who chose to pre-order the album received a code redeemable on the Sordid Sentinels Edition website for a rare recording of a live Pavement show at the Palace in Los Angeles on April 21, 1994. Also included in the pre-order deal was a free 7-inch record which included previously unreleased studio versions of the songs "Black Out" and "Extradition" and a poster based on a painting that artist Steve Keene originally contributed for the original release of Wowee Zowee in 1995.

Reception

Sordid Sentinels Edition received very positive reviews from critics, with Stylus Magazine describing it as "a large-scale painting of the best that the 90s rock underground had to offer." In contrast, The Guardian did not consider the album's extra tracks essential listenings.

As of 2010, Sordid Sentinels Edition had sold 32,000 copies.

Track listing

Disc one

Wowee Zowee
"We Dance"
"Rattled by the Rush"
"Black Out"
"Brinx Job"
"Grounded"
"Serpentine Pad"
"Motion Suggests Itself"
"Father to a Sister of Thought"
"Extradition"
"Best Friend's Arm"
"Grave Architecture"
"AT&T"
"Flux = Rad"
"Fight This Generation"
"Kennel District"
"Pueblo"
"Half a Canyon"
"Western Homes"

Wowee Zowee session outtake"Sordid"Rattled by the Rush EP"Brink of the Clouds"
"False Skorpion"
"Easily Fooled""Father to a Sister of Thought" single"Kris Kraft"
"Mussle Rock (Is a Horse in Transition)"Pacific Trim EP
"Give It a Day"
"Gangsters & Pranksters"
"Saganaw"
"I Love Perth"

Wowee Zowee session outtake
 "Sentinel"

Disc two

''I Shot Andy Warhol soundtrack1. "Sensitive Euro Man"Wowee Zowee session outtake2. "Stray Fire"Recorded March 3, 1994, at Hilversum, Netherlands3. "Fight This Generation"
4. "Easily Fooled"Wowee Zowee session with Doug Easley on piano5. "Soul Food"Homage to Descendents tribute album6. "It's a Hectic World"Steve Lamacq Evening Session (March 15, 1995)7. "Kris Kraft"
8. "Golden Boys/Serpentine Pad"
9. "Painted Soldiers"
10. "I Love Perth"Medusa Cyclone/Pavement split 7-inch11. "Dancing with the Elders"Recorded live at Wireless JJJ Radio in Australia (July 7, 1994)12. "Half a Canyon"
13. "Best Friend's Arm"
14. "Brink of the Clouds/Candylad"
15. "Unfair"
16. "Easily Fooled"
17. "Heaven Is a Truck"
18. "Box Elder"Schoolhouse Rock! Rocks compilation19. "No More Kings"Kids in the Hall: Brain Candy soundtrack20. "Painted Soldiers"Wowee Zowee'' session outtake
21. "We Dance" (alternate mix)

References

2006 compilation albums
Pavement (band) albums
Matador Records compilation albums